Venetian School may refer to:

 Venetian School (music), the body and work of composers working in Venice from c. 1550 to c. 1610
 Venetian school (art), the art scene in Venice from the 14th to 18th century
 Venetian Gothic architecture
 Venetian Renaissance architecture

See also
Venetian (disambiguation)